The Deep Lake Water Cooling System or DLWC is a deep water source cooling project in Toronto, Canada. As a renewable energy project, it involves running cold water from Lake Ontario, to air-condition buildings located downtown Toronto.

The DLWC was built by Enwave, and opened August 17, 2004. Notable clients include Toronto-Dominion Centre, Royal Bank Plaza, RBC Centre, Metro Toronto Convention Centre and Scotiabank Arena.

Compared to traditional air-conditioning, Deep Lake Water Cooling reduces electricity use by 75%, and may eliminate 40,000 tonnes of carbon dioxide, the equivalent of taking 8,000 cars off the streets.

Development 
Construction began in 1997, and received money from the Federation of Canadian Municipalities.
It was officially launched on August 17, 2004, at Steam Whistle Brewing, one of Enwave's customers. The launch was attended by actor Alec Baldwin, Ontario Minister of Energy Dwight Duncan, Canadian Minister of Human Resources and Skills Development Joe Volpe, and Toronto Deputy Mayor Sandra Bussin. The launch coincided with the anniversary of the 2003 blackout.

Mechanism 
The DLWC involves three large pipes have been run 5 kilometres (3 miles) into Lake Ontario, to a depth of 83 metres. The water at that depth is a constant 4 °C (39 °F), its temperature protected by a layer of water above it, called a thermocline. The water is piped to a filtration plant and then to a heat-transfer station on the lakeside. Here the chill is “transferred” to another closed loop, consisting of smaller pipes that supply the towers of the city's financial district. Built at a cost of C$230m ($200m) over four years, the system is run by the Enwave Energy Corporation.

Cold lake water is pumped through the source side of heat exchangers situated at Toronto's John Street Pumping Station while a glycol and water mixture is circulated through the load circuit of the heat exchanger, allowing for a net energy transfer from the water/glycol mixture to the lake water. The chiller glycol mixture is then circulated using pumps throughout fan-coil units installed in high-rise properties throughout the region served by Enwave in Downtown Toronto where is absorbs energy and repeats the cycle to provide cooling and dehumidification. This system is advantageous since it reduces, or even completely eradicates chiller usage during summer months and shoulder seasons, reducing energy usage, as well as minimizing the number of evaporative cooling towers from operating, which are susceptible to becoming breeding grounds for Legionella pneumophila.

See also
 Ashbridges Bay Wastewater Treatment Plant
 Toronto Water

References 

Buildings and structures in Toronto
Renewable energy in Canada
Geothermal energy in Canada
District cooling